

Legend

List

References

1994-95